The West End Bar, also known for a time as the "West End Gate", was located on Broadway near 114th Street in Morningside Heights, Manhattan, New York City. From its establishment in 1911, the bar served as a common gathering place for Columbia University students, faculty and administration (its slogan was "Where Columbia Had Its First Beer"). The bar was also a meeting place for many Beat Generation writers as well as many 1960s student activists when they attended the university.

History
In the early 1940s, in the formative days of the Beat Generation, students including Allen Ginsberg, Jack Kerouac, and Lucien Carr spent hours at the bar discussing their studies and their futures. In the 1960s, the bar was host to student activists upset about racial discrimination in the area and US foreign policy regarding Vietnam. Mark Rudd, who led the Columbia branch of Students for a Democratic Society and was a prominent member of the Weather Underground after his expulsion from the university in 1968, spent time at the bar while a student.

After closing for a year and a half, it was leased from Columbia University by a group led by Jeff Spiegel and his wife Katie Gardner, a graduate of Columbia's School of Journalism. They renovated The West End, making an effort to have it look like it might have looked as an old Victorian era bar/restaurant. They expanded one room for catering, parties and even beer pong, a basement room for live jazz, and a large side dining room that could be used late night, after the kitchen was closed, by drinkers and revelers.

Jazz historian Phil Schaap ran a jazz program at the venue beginning when he was an undergraduate at Columbia in the 1970s. It was later discontinued as a nightly feature.

In 2004, The West End  began brewing its own beers including its very popular, nearly 10% "Ker O'Whack", named for Columbia dropout and author, Jack Kerouac.  The West End in 1990 also became a full-service restaurant, including a widely popular Sunday brunch. It installed flat screen monitors for sports events.  Playboy magazine featured The West End as "College Bar of the Month" in its February 2005 issue.

The West End qua West End was sold in April 2006 and was replaced in late 2006 by "Havana Central at the West End", part of the expanding "Havana Central" chain of Cuban restaurants. The Havana Central closed on May 28, 2014, when the lease ended. In September 2014, the space reopened as Bernheim & Schwartz Restaurant and Hall, which was described by its owners as a tribute to brewing in Manhattan, and especially to Bernheim & Schwartz, a brewery founded in 1903 and  located at 128th Street and Amsterdam Avenue. Bernheim & Schwartz closed in April 2017. In 2021, the space reopened as Hex & Co., a board game café.

References

External links
 Columbia Spectator piece announcing sale and transformation of the West End into a Cuban restaurant
 Columbia Spectator piece describing plans for Havana Central at the West End
 Columbia Spectator piece on closing of the West End, with a bit of history
 Columbia Spectator piece of reminiscences of the West End
 Bwog post announcing the new tenant

History of Columbia University
Cuban-American culture in New York (state)
Cuban restaurants in the United States
Defunct drinking establishments in Manhattan
Hispanic and Latino American culture in New York City
West End Avenue
Upper West Side
1911 establishments in New York City
2014 disestablishments in New York (state)
Morningside Heights, Manhattan